The North Huron Citizen is a weekly newspaper covering the communities of Blyth and Brussels, Ontario, along with the townships of Huron East, North Huron, Morris-Turnberry and Central Huron. It is a community owned newspaper started in 1985, after the Brussels Post and the Blyth Standard ceased operations. In 2016, it was selected as the Best All Around newspaper with a circulation of 1,250 to 1,999 by the Canadian Community Newspaper Awards.

References

Weekly newspapers published in Ontario
1985 establishments in Ontario
Newspapers established in 1985